Slavgorodsky District was an administrative and municipal district (raion) of Altai Krai, Russia. Its administrative center was the town of Slavgorod (which was not administratively a part of the district). Population:

History
The district was abolished effective January 1, 2012, with its territory transferred under the jurisdiction of the town of krai significance of Slavgorod.

References

Notes

Sources

Districts of Altai Krai
States and territories disestablished in 2012

